Chhattisgarh embraces a diverse cultural and traditional practices in India. As the state government has taken meticulous steps to preserve the tribal culture, these festivals and the traditions are celebrated almost from the time of ancient India.

The festival of Chhattisgarh 
 Bastar Dussehra
 Bastar Dussehra in Chhattisgarh is dedicated to goddess Danteshwari, the supreme power and revered deity of all existing tribes in Chhattisgarh. The divine goddess is worshipped at Danteshwari temple in Jagdalpur. The festival is known to be celebrated in a span of 72 days, making it one of the longest festivals in India. This is unlike any other Dussehra festival in India, which is celebrated for Rama’s victory over Ravana.
 Bastar Lokutsab
 Bastar LokLōka utsavaotsav represents the folk culture of the Chhattisgarh state. It is celebrated after the end of rainy season and boast participation of tribal groups coming from remote locations of Chhattisgarh to Bastar. Basta Parab, an event organised in Jagdalpur during the festival features songs and dances of tribes in Chhattisgarh. Elaborated tribal arts and handicrafts are exhibited in the festival.
 Bhoramdeo Festival.
 The festival was first organized by Maharaja Ramchandra Deo from Nagavanshi dynasty, who also laid the foundation of the temple Bhoramdeo temple in 1349. The festival commences during the end of March when a large number of folk artist from various region of Chhattisgarh participate and temple compound turns into a cultural embellishment.
 Champaran Mela
 Champaran is one of the important pilgrims in India and said to be the birthplace of Saint Vallabhacharya, the founder and reformer of Vallabha community. Champaran mela is organized during Magh ie between January to February and participated by a large number of pushtimargiya Vaishnavs from various corners of India.
 Chhattisgarh Foundation Day (Chhattisgarh Rajyotsav)
 1 November of every year is celebrated as Chhattisgarh Foundation day as on this date in the year 2000. The President of India gave his consent to Madhya Pradesh Reorganisation Act 2000 on 25 August and then Government of India set 1 November, 2000 as the day Madhya Pradesh would be divided into Chhattisgarh and Madhya Pradesh.
 Chhattisgarhi Language Day
 28 November is celebrated as Chhattisgari Language day as it was on the date in the year 2007 when Vidhan Sabha granted Chhattisgari a status of state language.
 Goncha Festival
 Madai Festival
 Teeja Festival
 Narayanpur Mela
 Pola
 Rajim Kumbha Mela
 Hareli
 First fruit Festival
 Earth Festival

External links 
 Chhattisgarh Cultural Department

 Chhattisgarh Tourism
 Bastar Lokotsav

Culture of Chhattisgarh